An Là (The Day) is a Scottish Gaelic-language news programme broadcast on the Gaelic-language channel, BBC Alba.
 
The programme, based at BBC Alba's newsroom in Inverness, began at 8pm on 22 September 2008 and provides a 30-minute bulletin of Scottish, British and international news for Gaelic speakers seven days a week. The Sunday night review programme, composed of highlights from the week's bulletins as well as material from Eòrpa, called Seachd Là, began at 6.30pm on 28 September 2008.

Broadcast history
An Là broadcasts from Studio G at the BBC in Inverness. Seachd Là, weather and the An Là sports news all come from BBC Pacific Quay in Glasgow.

An Là is the first daily television news programme to be broadcast in Scots Gaelic since the axing of Grampian Television's Telefios bulletins in 2000.
  
An Là was shortlisted in the Best Current Affairs category at the 2009 Celtic Media Festival.

The Team

News anchors
Angela MacLean
Iain MacLean
Donald Angus Morrison
Karen Elder
Innes Munro
Anne McAlpine
Iain Macinnes

Weather presenters

Kirsteen MacDonald
Joy Dunlop
Sarah Cruickshank
 Anne McAlpine
 Derek MacIntosh

Reporters
Scottish Parliament
Niall O'Gallagher (politics)

See also
 Seachd Là
 Telefios

External links
 

2008 establishments in Scotland
2008 Scottish television series debuts
2000s Scottish television series
2010s Scottish television series
2020s Scottish television series
BBC Alba shows
BBC Regional News shows
BBC Scotland television shows
Politics of Scotland